Yvonne Mai (born in Hamburg, Germany) is an American-German actress, with Danish and French roots.

Early career 
Mai developed an interest in modelling and theater in early stages of her life. As a teenager she began modelling and stage work in Germany. In her late teens she was scouted for the German TV series ‘Die Schulermittler’ as a lead.

Career 
Mai is currently signed with International Artists Management (IAM) in London, UK. The Drop and Reflections.

Additionally, she has worked on global commercial campaigns with brands such as John Frieda, Neutrogena, Peloton, Ikea and more.

References 

Actresses from Hamburg
Year of birth missing (living people)
Living people